The Breg is a river, 46 kilometres long, in Baden-Württemberg, Germany, and the primary headstream of the Danube.

Description 
The  Breg  is the longest and biggest headstream of the River Danube. It flows through the southeast part of the Middle Black Forest and the lowlands of the Baar region.

Its source, which is near St. Martin's Chapel and is also called the source of the Danube or Donauquelle, is protected as a natural monument. It is located about 100 metres south-east of the Rhine / Danube  watershed (the great European Watershed). Beyond that, but only about 900 metres away is the source of the Elz, which flows in the same longitudinal valley but initially in the opposite direction, to the north, and later flows into the Rhine.

In its upper section, known as the Katzensteig, the Breg valley is clearly a result of glaciation, with a strikingly low gradient and landscape characterized by large Black Forest houses. Between the towns of Furtwangen and Vöhrenbach, the Breg flows eastwards through a broader and somewhat more densely populated valley, then in a generally southeasterly direction through a solitary forest valley, accompanied by a road and the route of the former Breg Valley Railway, which is now a bicycle track. Shortly before Hammereisenbach-Bregenbach, the Breg is joined by the Linach just below the Linach Dam and, in the village, by the Hammerbach, a short tributary, but the most important thanks to its two large headstreams. Near Bräunlingen, the Breg meets the Röthenbach stream at the Kirnbergsee. Here the Breg leaves the Black Forest and continues via Hüfingen to Donaueschingen, through wide, open countryside on the plateau of the Baar.

After 46.2 kilometres, the Breg merges with the Brigach in Donaueschingen to form the Danube - "Brigach und Breg bringen die Donau zuweg" ("Brigach and Breg bring the Danube together") as the well known rhyme goes. Since the Breg is not only the longest, but also the most voluminous river of the Danube with a catchment area of 291.5 km², its source is considered hydrographically as the source of the Danube (Donauquelle).

Tributaries 
This list only shows the more important tributaries. For the full list see :de: Liste der Zuflüsse der Breg
 Schützenbach (left)
 Hintere Breg (right)
 Rohrbach (left)
 Langenbach (left)
 Linach (right)
 Hammerbach (right) with the upper reaches of the Eisenbach and Urach
 Forbach (left)
 Kohldobelbächle (left)
 Reichenbächle (right)
 Weiherbach (left)
 Landgraben (right)
 Röthenbach (right)

References

External links 

 
 Catchment of the Breg on the map services of the LUBW

Rivers of Baden-Württemberg
Danube
Rivers of the Black Forest
Rivers of Germany